Micrapate is a genus of horned powder-post beetles in the family Bostrichidae. There are at least 40 described species in Micrapate.

Species
These 42 species belong to the genus Micrapate:

 Micrapate albertiana Lesne, 1943 i c g
 Micrapate amplicollis (Lesne, 1899) i c g
 Micrapate atra (Lesne, 1899) i c g
 Micrapate bicostula Lesne, 1906 i c g
 Micrapate bilobata Fisher, 1950 i c g b
 Micrapate brasiliensis (Lesne, 1899) i c g
 Micrapate brevipes (Lesne, 1899) i c g
 Micrapate bruchi Lesne, 1931 i c g
 Micrapate brunnipes (Fabricius, 1801) i c g
 Micrapate catamarcana Lesne, 1931 i c g
 Micrapate cordobiana Lesne, 1931 i c g
 Micrapate cribripennis (Lesne, 1899) i c g
 Micrapate cristicauda Casey, 1898 i c g b
 Micrapate dinoderoides (Horn, 1878) i c g b
 Micrapate discrepans Lesne, 1939 i c g
 Micrapate exigua (Lesne, 1899) i c g
 Micrapate foraminata Lesne, 1906 i c g
 Micrapate fusca (Lesne, 1899) i c g
 Micrapate germaini (Lesne, 1899) i c g
 Micrapate guatemalensis Lesne, 1906 i c g
 Micrapate horni (Lesne, 1899) i c g
 Micrapate humeralis (Blanchard, 1851) i c g
 Micrapate kiangana Lesne, 1935 i c g
 Micrapate labialis Lesne, 1906 i c g
 Micrapate leechi Vrydagh, 1960 i c g
 Micrapate mexicana Fisher, 1950 i c g
 Micrapate neglecta Lesne, 1906 i c g
 Micrapate obesa (Lesne, 1899) i c g
 Micrapate pinguis Lesne, 1939 i c g
 Micrapate puberula Lesne, 1906 i c g
 Micrapate puncticollis (von Kiesenwetter, 1877) g
 Micrapate pupulus Lesne, 1906 i c g
 Micrapate quadraticollis (Lesne, 1899) i c g
 Micrapate scabrata (Erichson, 1847) i c g
 Micrapate scapularis (Gorham, 1883) i c g
 Micrapate schoutedeni Lesne, 1935 i c g
 Micrapate sericeicollis Lesne, 1906 i c g
 Micrapate simplicipennis (Lesne, 1895) i c g
 Micrapate straeleni Vrydagh, 1954 i c g
 Micrapate unguiculata Lesne, 1906 i c g
 Micrapate wagneri Lesne, 1906 i c g
 Micrapate xyloperthoides (Jacquelin du Val, 1859) i c g

Data sources: i = ITIS, c = Catalogue of Life, g = GBIF, b = Bugguide.net

References

Further reading

External links

 

Bostrichidae